Prisojnik or Prisank is a mountain of the Julian Alps in Slovenia. Its summit is 2,547m above sea level. It is located above the 
Vršič Pass, from where most climbs of the mountain start.

References

External links 
 Prisojnik on hribi.net

Mountains of the Julian Alps
Two-thousanders of Slovenia